Samiullah (born 23 October 2001) is an Afghan cricketer. He made his first-class debut for Amo Sharks in the 2017–18 Ahmad Shah Abdali 4-day Tournament on 20 October 2017. He made his List A debut for Amo Region in the 2018 Ghazi Amanullah Khan Regional One Day Tournament on 25 July 2018.

In September 2018, he was named in Balkh's squad in the first edition of the Afghanistan Premier League tournament. He made his Twenty20 debut for Balkh Legends in the 2018–19 Afghanistan Premier League on 18 October 2018.

References

External links
 

2001 births
Living people
Afghan cricketers
Amo Sharks cricketers
Balkh Legends cricketers
Sportspeople from Kunduz